Christopher Sacchin (born 22 April 1983 in Bolzano) is an Italian diver.

In the 1 metre springboard event he won the bronze medals at the 2007 World Championships and the European Championships in 2006 and 2008.

References
The Italian Wikipedia

1983 births
Living people
Italian male divers
Sportspeople from Bolzano
Universiade medalists in diving
Universiade bronze medalists for Italy
Divers of Centro Sportivo Carabinieri
Medalists at the 2003 Summer Universiade